Bano Megolhusau Haralu is an Indian journalist and a conservationist from Nagaland. She worked with Doordarshan, NDTV and was the editor of Eastern Mirror. She was awarded the Chameli Devi Jain Award for Outstanding Women Mediapersons and Nari Shakti Puraskar. She is a Director of the Nagaland Wildlife and Biodiversity Conservation Trust.

References

Indian women journalists
Year of birth missing (living people)
Nari Shakti Puraskar winners
Living people